John White (2 March 1855 – date of death unknown) was an English cricketer. White's batting style is unknown, though it is known he played as a wicket-keeper. He was born at Bulwell, Nottinghamshire.

White made his debut in first-class for the North of England in the North v South fixture of 1886 at Lords', during which White scored 62 runs batting at number ten in a tenth record stand of 157 runs with John Parnham (who made 90 not out), in what was the highest wicket partnership of the innings. The North won the match by 9 wickets. In that same season he made a first-class appearance for Liverpool and District against the touring Australians, and followed this up with a second first-class appearance for the team in 1890 against Yorkshire. He ended his brief first-class career with 73 runs at an average of 18.25, with four catches and two stumpings to his name.

References

External links
John White at ESPNcricinfo
John White at CricketArchive

1855 births
People from Bulwell
Cricketers from Nottinghamshire
English cricketers
North v South cricketers
Liverpool and District cricketers
Year of death missing
Wicket-keepers